There was no previous year champions since the tournament was stopped due to heavy rain. 

Mariaan de Swardt and Jana Novotná won in the final 6–1, 6–3 against Arantxa Sánchez Vicario and Natasha Zvereva.

Seeds
Champion seeds are indicated in bold text while text in italics indicates the round in which those seeds were eliminated.

 Arantxa Sánchez Vicario /  Natasha Zvereva (final)
 Alexandra Fusai /  Nathalie Tauziat (quarterfinals)
 Yayuk Basuki /  Caroline Vis (semifinals)
 Anna Kournikova /  Larisa Neiland (quarterfinals)

Draw

External links
 1998 Direct Line International Championships Doubles draw

Doubles
Doubles 1998